Michael Alan Houghton was Bishop of Ebbsfleet from 1998 to 1999.

Houghton was born on 14 June 1949  and educated at the University of Lancaster. He worked for British Rail and as a teacher before studying for the priesthood. He was a curate at  All Hallows' Wellingborough  followed by a period overseas as the parish priest of Jamestown, Saint Helena. From 1984 to 1989 he was a tutor at the College of the Ascension, Selly Oak then became the Vicar of  St Peter's Folkestone until his ordination to the episcopate as the second Bishop of Ebbsfleet. He died in office following a heart attack on 18 December 1999, six months after his 50th birthday.

References

1949 births
1999 deaths
Alumni of Lancaster University
Bishops of Ebbsfleet
British Rail people